Elizabet Tursynbaeva (Elizabet Tūrsynbaeva; born 14 February 2000) is a Kazakh retired figure skater. She is the 2019 World silver medalist, the 2019 Four Continents silver medalist, the 2017 CS Ice Star champion, the 2018 CS Finlandia Trophy silver medalist, the 2015 CS Golden Spin of Zagreb silver medalist, the 2019 Winter Universiade silver medalist, and a three-time Kazakhstani national champion (2015-2017). She placed 12th at the 2018 Winter Olympics. Having successfully landed a quadruple Salchow at the 2019 World Figure Skating Championships, Tursynbaeva is the first female skater to land a quadruple jump in senior international competition.

Competing in the junior ranks, Tursynbaeva won bronze at the 2016 Winter Youth Olympics and silver at two ISU Junior Grand Prix events.

Tursynbaeva placed 12th at the 2018 Winter Olympics and was the 20th highest ranked ladies' singles skater in the world by the International Skating Union following the 2019–20 figure skating season.

In September 2021, she announced her retirement due to a chronic back injury.

Personal life 
Elizabet Tursynbaeva was born on 14 February 2000 in Moscow, Russia. She is the daughter of Padishakhan Sultanalieva and Baitak Tursynbaev. Her family is originally from Kazakhstan. Her brother, Timur Tursynbaev, who is two years older than her, is a two-time Kazakhstan national figure skating champion. Tursynbaeva is a professional violinist and can also play the piano. She attended a special music school in Moscow. She and her mother settled in Toronto, Ontario, Canada, in May 2015, where she was home-schooled. In 2018 they relocated back to Moscow, Russia. Tursynbaeva speaks Russian and English.

Because of her small stature, she is known to many of her fans as "Lilbet".

Career

Early career 
Tursynbaeva started skating at the age of five after following her brother, Timur, into figure skating. As a child, she was coached by Natalia Dubinskaya and Alexander Shubin. She was also briefly coached by Elena Buianova and Svetlana Sokolovskaya from 2011 to 2012, before switching to Eteri Tutberidze.

Representing Kazakhstan, Tursynbaeva made her international debut in April 2011, placing fourth in the novice ladies' category at the Rooster Cup. She won the novice bronze medal at the 2011 NRW Trophy. After finishing thirteenth at the 2013 Russian Junior Championships, she decided to continue representing Kazakhstan. She made no international appearances for Russia.

Her coaching relationship with Tutberidze ended in 2013 because Russian coaches no longer had the right to work with non-Russian skaters during the 2014 Olympic season. Having difficulty finding a coach in Russia, Tursynbaeva and her mother wrote a letter to Brian Orser, whom she had always wanted as a coach, and sent him videos of her, asking if he could coach her. Orser, impressed by her talent, responded that he would love to work with her.

2013–2014 season: Junior international debut 
Before the 2013–2014 season, Tursynbaeva began training under Brian Orser and Tracy Wilson in Toronto, Canada. In September 2013, she won the silver medal in her ISU Junior Grand Prix (JGP) debut, in Minsk, Belarus. She placed fifth at her second JGP event, in Tallinn, Estonia, and eleventh at the 2014 World Junior Championships in Sofia, Bulgaria. She ended her season with gold at the 2014 Triglav Trophy in Slovenia.

2014–2015 season 
During the 2014 JGP series, Tursynbaeva won bronze in Aichi, Japan and silver in Dresden, Germany, finishing as the second alternate for the JGP Final. She then won the junior ladies' titles at the International Cup of Nice, Merano Cup, and NRW Trophy. At the 2015 World Junior Championships in Tallinn, she placed seventh in the short program, fourth in the free skate, and fourth overall.

Most of this season, Tursynbaeva experienced visa problems, which meant that she spent only part of the season training in Toronto under Orser and instead trained mainly at a shopping mall ice rink in Moscow with her mother.

2015–2016 season: Senior international debut 

Tursynbaeva became eligible to compete internationally at the senior level for the first time in the 2015-16 season. She was invited to two Grand Prix events. Due to her ongoing visa problem, her first short program, Send In the Clowns, was created in Russia. Her exhibition program, I Got Rhythm, became her short program later during the season.

Tursynbaeva began her season by winning silver at the 2015 U.S. Classic, her first ISU Challenger Series (CS) event, and gold at the 2015 Skate Canada Autumn Classic. Making her Grand Prix debut, she placed fourth at the 2015 Skate America and seventh at the 2015 Skate Canada International. She then won silver medals at the 2015 CS Tallinn Trophy and 2015 CS Golden Spin of Zagreb.

In February 2016, Tursynbaeva won the individual bronze medal, behind Russians Polina Tsurskaya and Maria Sotskova, at the Winter Youth Olympics in Hamar, Norway. In March, she rose from fourteenth after the short to finish fifth overall (fourth in the free) at the 2016 World Junior Championships in Debrecen, Hungary. In April, she finished twelfth at the 2016 World Championships in Boston after placing twelfth in the short and tenth in the free. Later that month, she competed at her first team event, the 2016 Team Challenge Cup in Spokane, Washington.

2016–2017 season 
Tursynbaeva won the bronze medal at the 2016 CS Autumn Classic International. She appeared as a torch-bearer for the 2017 Winter Universiade but was too young to compete. At the 2017 Four Continents Championships in Gangneung, South Korea, she received a small bronze medal for her short program and finished eighth overall. Later that month, she placed third at the 2017 Asian Winter Games. Tursynbaeva would go on to finish ninth at the 2017 World Championships, scoring personal bests in the free skate and combined total scores. Her ninth-place finish qualified two spots for the ladies' singles event for the 2018 Winter Olympics in Pyeongchang and 2018 World Championships in Milan. During the season, videos surfaced of Tursynbaeva completing fully rotated quad Salchow jumps, along with quadruple Salchows in combination with double and triple toe-loops.

2017–2018 season 
Tursynbaeva won the bronze medal at the 2017 CS Autumn Classic International, and then placed eighth at the 2017 Rostelecom Cup. She went on to win the 2017 CS Minsk-Arena Ice Star. She scored a personal best, placing fifth, at the 2017 Internationaux de France. At her next competition, the 2018 Four Continents Championships, she received her lowest scores of the season and finished twelfth. She went on to place twelfth at the 2018 Winter Olympics, and eleventh at the 2018 World Figure Skating Championships.

2018–2019 season 

In June, Tursynbaeva announced that she had changed coaches from Brian Orser and Tracy Wilson back to her previous coach, Eteri Tutberidze. Beginning on the Challenger series, Tursynbaeva won silver medals at both the Finlandia Trophy and the Ondrej Nepela Trophy.  Assigned to two Grand Prix events, she finished fifth at the 2018 Skate Canada International and sixth at the 2018 Rostelecom Cup.

At the 2019 Four Continents Championships, she placed sixth in the short program after turning out of her double Axel. She placed third in the free skate, which included an attempted quad Salchow that she fully rotated but fell on, and won the silver medal overall.  This was only the second Four Continents medal for a Kazakh skater (after Denis Ten), and the first for a lady.  Speaking afterward, Tursynbaeva admitted that she did not expect to make the podium.  Regarding the quad, she said "I still have work to do on it, but it wasn’t bad for a first time in competition."

Tursynbaeva next competed in the 2019 Winter Universiade. She placed fourth after the short program and first in the free skate. Her free skate included an attempted quad Salchow that she fell on. She was able to deliver the rest of her program without any mistakes and won the silver medal, becoming the second Kazakh skater (again after Denis Ten) to medal at a Winter Universiade, and the first to medal in ladies' singles.

At the 2019 World Championships, she placed third in the short program executing triple Salchow-triple toe loop combination in the second half of the program, earning bonus 10% and a triple Lutz. She placed fourth in the free skate, successfully landing the quad Salchow and becoming the first woman to ever land a quad jump at the World Championships in ladies' singles. She finished in second place overall, winning the silver medal and becoming the second Kazakh skater to medal at the World Championships and the first to do so in ladies' singles. In an interview when asked about her performance and the quad, she said "I can't believe I landed it, it was good in practice this morning. I couldn't do it at the last two competitions so I was really glad to be able to do it here."

2019–2020 season 
Tursynbaeva suffered from recurring injury issues that compelled her to withdraw from the 2019 CS Lombardia Trophy. She did compete at the 2019 Shanghai Trophy, winning the silver medal, but withdrew from her first Grand Prix assignment, 2019 Skate America. She subsequently withdrew from the 2019 Cup of China as well, stating that she hoped to be well enough to participate in ice shows later in the year.

Elizabet Tursynbayeva, along with another famous Kazakh ice skater Kseniya Pankratova, went viral in 2021 for their Instagram video of their ice skating performances on a frozen lake in Kazakhstan.

Programs

Competitive highlights 
GP: Grand Prix; CS: Challenger Series; JGP: Junior Grand Prix

Detailed results

Senior level

Small medals for short and free programs awarded only at ISU Championships. At team events, medals awarded for team results only.

Junior level

References

External links 

 

2000 births
Living people
Figure skaters from Moscow
Kazakhstani female single skaters
Figure skaters at the 2017 Asian Winter Games
Medalists at the 2017 Asian Winter Games
Asian Games bronze medalists for Kazakhstan
Figure skaters at the 2016 Winter Youth Olympics
Figure skaters at the 2018 Winter Olympics
Olympic figure skaters of Kazakhstan
Asian Games medalists in figure skating
Universiade silver medalists for Kazakhstan
Universiade medalists in figure skating
Competitors at the 2019 Winter Universiade
Four Continents Figure Skating Championships medalists